The Royal Kituro Avia Schaerbeek Rugby Club, often shortened Kituro RC, is a Belgian rugby union club currently competing in the Belgian Elite League. On 8th February 2015, they beat RC Soignies 356-3, breaking the all-time record for the highest scoring game in Rugby union history.

The club is based in Schaerbeek, a suburb to Brussels.
The official colours of the club are green and black. The Kituro is a 50-year-old rugby club; one of the most successful and best known in Belgium with more than 560 players from U7 to U19, Seniors, Veterans, Ladies and a Touch Team.

It benefits from the best quality rugby ground in Belgium with its two new synthetic pitches (International IRB Standards), six changing rooms and a friendly and very comfortable club house.

The club is located in Brussels alongside the Boulevard Léopold III (Zaventem airport highway) between NATO and the EU Schuman area.

History
The club was founded in 1961 by international referee Teddy Lacroix along with Volcanologist and Rugby Player Haroun Tazieff who choose to name the club after Mount Kituro in the former Belgian Colony of Congo. The club was donated land by the City Of Brussels and quickly established itself as a major force in Belgian Rugby. The heir to the Belgian Throne Prince Philippe, Duke of Brabant played for the team.

Kituro has won the Belgian Elite League title on five occasions and most recently in May 2015. In the same year, they also recorded the largest win in rugby history, beating Soignies Rugby Club 356-3.

Recent History
2017 saw a change of president at the club with Philip Van Perlstein taking over from Claude Orban. At the end of the season Van Perlstein called in Philippe Brantegem from La Hulpe Rugby Club to head up the new coaching staff.

During the 2018/19 mid season break, Kituro announced the arrival of Peter Lang from Scotland as the new assistant coach. Lang was announced as the new head coach for the 2019/20 season.

Honours
 Belgian Elite League
 Champions: 1967, 1996, 2009, 2011, 2015
 Belgian Cup
 Champions: 1969, 1977, 1981, 1983, 1993, 1998
 Belgian Super Cup
 Champions: 2011, 2012
 Belgium Touch Championship
 2010, 2011, 2012, 2013, 2014

Season by Season

Notable players
 Vincent Debaty
 Jimmy Parker
 Julien Berger
 Charles Reynaert

See also
 Rugby union in Belgium
 Belgian Elite League

References

External links
 Official site

Belgian rugby union clubs